Alexander Amos Yee  (born 18 February 1998) is a British professional triathlete and distance runner. He won the silver medal in the Men's Triathlon at the Tokyo 2020 Olympics and the gold medal in the Triathlon Mixed Relay at the Tokyo 2020 Olympics on Saturday 31 July 2021. He is also the 2022 Commonwealth Games triathlon champion in both the men's and mixed team events. He is a double World Championship medalist over the World Triathlon Championship Series, with silver in 2022, and bronze in 2021

In 2022, Yee won his first individual World Championship, the 2022 World Triathlon Sprint Championships in Montreal in Canada. Yee has also been part of the gold medal-winning relay team in the World Triathlon Mixed Relay Championships in Nottingham in 2019. He won silver in the same event in Montreal, securing Great Britain its first quota places in the 2024 Summer Olympics.

In non-traditional formats, Yee was the winner of the 2021 Super League Triathlon Championship Series. In 2022, he became the inaugural Esport Triathlon World Champion, after finishing second at both the London and the Singapore Arena Games Triathlon event.

As a distance runner, Yee was the 2018 British 10,000m champion, and led Great Britain to the team silver medal in the European 10,000m Cup as both races were combined as part of the Night of 10,000m PBs festival event at Parliament Hill. He represented Great Britain in the subsequent European Athletics Championships.

Early life

Education
Yee completed his A levels at Kingsdale Foundation School in West Dulwich and then went on to study for a BSc in Sport and Exercise Science at Leeds Beckett University.

Career

2016 season

On 4 June 2016 Alex won the ITU World Junior Duathlon Championships in Avilés in northern Spain.

As a result, he was shortlisted for the SportsAid "One to Watch" award which he went on to win, receiving his award from Sir Mo Farah at the ceremony in November.

2017 season

At the ITU Triathlon World Cup race in Cagliari in Sardinia, Italy on 4 June 2017, Alex tangled with another competitor on the bike and crashed into a concrete bollard, suffering broken ribs and vertebrae and a pneumothorax (collapsed lung).

2018 season

Athletics

On 19 May 2018 Yee set a PB (Personal Best) in the 10,000m of 27:51.94, less than five seconds outside the British under-23 record of 27:47.0 set in 1971 by Dave Bedford.

Earlier in the year, Yee set the second quickest ever Parkrun time to date, clocking 13:57 at Dulwich.

Triathlon

Alex started his 2018 triathlon season off with a 6th place at the Gran Canaria ETU Sprint Triathlon European Cup, following this with an 8th place at the Cagliari ITU World Cup, returning to the site of his accident a year prior.

June saw him compete at Antwerp, registering a disappointing 49th place (despite producing the fastest run split), and then in September he competed in the U23 category at the ITU World Triathlon Grand Final in Gold Coast, coming home 10th.

Later the same month he made it onto the podium for the first and only time in 2018, taking bronze at the ITU World Cup in Weihai in China.

2019 season
Alex made his debut in the ITU World Triathlon Series at Abu Dhabi with a sprint-distance race on 8 March 2019. After a strong swim and bike he recorded the second-fastest 5 km run of the race to finish second  to Mario Mola in a race that saw 9 DNFs.

In the build-up to the race, Alex confirmed his view that he was a triathlete first and foremost, despite being a nationally ranked runner, and stated his intentions to qualify for the 2020 Tokyo Olympics.

Following this he took on his first ITU World Triathlon Series Standard Distance event at Yokohama in Japan, finishing in 5th overall.

Later the same year, he went on to record a Gold in Nottingham in the Mixed Team relay in June in less-than-ideal weather conditions, resulting in the race being altered to a duathlon format (run, bike, run). Georgia Taylor-Brown took the first leg, followed by Ben Dijkstra, Sophie Coldwell in leg 3 and Yee on the anchor leg to seal the victory ahead of Switzerland in Silver and France in Bronze.

Team GB recorded a Silver two months later in the same discipline in Tokyo, with Yee being beaten at the line on the final leg by Dorian Coninx representing France. The line-up was altered from that fielded at Nottingham, with Jess Learmonth, Gordon Benson, Sophie Coldwell and Yee on the final leg.

This success followed a disappointing result in July in Hamburg where the team finished 10th overall, with the team comprising Jess Learmonth, Jonny Brownlee, Georgia Taylor-Brown and Yee on the final leg. Learmonth encountered problems on the swim, resulting in Team GB entering T1 in 15th place and unable to make up the deficit on subsequent legs.

Individually, Yee finished the season recording a 13th-place finish at the Grand Final in Lausanne in Switzerland, and an overall ITU WTS ranking of 12th, recording 2521 points from 5 races.

2020 season

Athletics
On 8 August, in the Podium 5 km at Barrowford, Lancashire, Yee ran 13:26 behind winner Marc Scott in 13:20, the second fastest 5 km time ever by a British athlete. Later in the month, Yee ran a personal best of 7:45.81 over 3000 metres at the Bromley Twilight Meeting.

Triathlon
Yee started his 2020 race programme as one of four male GB athletes at the ITU World Cup race at Mooloolaba in Australia, recording the fastest run time of 14:55 but only achieving a 37th-place finish overall due to a mechanical prior to T2.

2021 season
Yee won the silver medal in the 2020 Tokyo Olympics, held in 2021, as well as a gold medal in the mixed triathlon, in which he was the competitor to cross the finish line for the team.

Yee was appointed Member of the Order of the British Empire (MBE) in the 2022 New Year Honours for services to triathlon.

Yee won the 2021 Super League Triathlon Championship Series. He took victory in the final race of the series, held in Malibu, California, crossing the line just fractions of a second ahead of Belgium's Marten Van Riel. He also took the win at the Super League Triathlon, Jersey race, earlier in the season, finishing ahead of teammate Jonathan Brownlee in the process. Yee also finished second in the SLT Arena Games, Rotterdam 2021.

2022 season 
Yee competed in Super League Triathlon's Arena Games Triathlon Powered by Zwift Esports Triathlon series in 2022. The series will go on to crown the first ever triathlon Esports World Champion. At the first event of the series, held at Munich's Olympiapark, Yee finished in 6th. However, following a rule change at the next event, held at Queen Elizabeth Olympic Park London, Yee finished in 2nd, being narrowly beaten by Germany's Justus Nieschlag. At the final event of the series, held at Marina Bay, Singapore, Yee finished in second place behind New Zealand's Hayden Wilde. However, that was enough to see him take the win in the overall series, giving him the title of inaugural Esport Triathlon World Champion.

At the 2022 Commonwealth Games, Yee won the first gold medal of the Games by in triathlon. He emerged from the swim in 15th place, and chased down the leader in the run to win his first major race of the season. He won a second gold in the mixed relay with Sophie Coldwell, Sam Dickinson, and Georgia Taylor-Brown. He started in the first leg of the race to give the second leg a 20-second lead, which the team held on to win the race.

Yee competed as a wildcard at the opening event of the 2022 Super League Triathlon championship series in London. He finished the event in 3rd, behind Matthew Hauser and Hayden Wilde.

ITU World Triathlon Series Competitions
Yee's ITU World Triathlon Series race results are:;

ITU Triathlon World Cup Competitions 
Yee's ITU Triathlon World Cup Series race results are:;

References

External links
 
 
 

1998 births
Living people
English male triathletes
Alumni of Leeds Beckett University
Athletes from London
English male middle-distance runners
Triathletes at the 2020 Summer Olympics
Olympic gold medallists for Great Britain
Olympic silver medallists for Great Britain
Olympic medalists in triathlon
Medalists at the 2020 Summer Olympics
English people of Chinese descent
Olympic triathletes of Great Britain
Members of the Order of the British Empire
People from Lewisham
Triathletes at the 2022 Commonwealth Games
Commonwealth Games gold medallists for England
Commonwealth Games medallists in triathlon
Medallists at the 2022 Commonwealth Games